Sven Groen (born 30 May 1995) is a professional Dutch former darts player who currently plays in the Professional Darts Corporation (PDC) events.

Darts Career
He won the 14th Development Tour event of 2015 by beating Nick Kenny 4–2 in the final. He then overcame Mario Robbe 6–3 to win the Central European Qualifier for the 2016 World Championship, where he lost 2–1 to Kim Viljanen in the preliminary round. Groen failed to earn a tour card at Q School or qualify for the UK Open and in the rest of 2016 reached two quarter-finals in Challenge Tour events and one in a Development Tour event.

After losing in the final round of day one of 2017 Q School, Groen went on to finish third on the Order of Merit and earn a two-year PDC Tour Card.

Groen quit of the PDC in 2019.

World Championship results

PDC
 2016: Preliminary round (lost to Kim Viljanen 1–2) (sets)

References

External links

1995 births
Living people
Dutch darts players
People from Wijhe
Professional Darts Corporation former tour card holders
Sportspeople from Overijssel
21st-century Dutch people